Victoria Thornton OBE HonFRIBA is the founder of the Open House architecture concept which has sought to improve public engagement in architecture and urban design. In 1992, she founded the architecture education charity Open-City and the initiatives Open House London and, later, Open House Worldwide. The Open House initiative highlights the value of design in creating liveable cities and the role everyone plays in them through dialogue with key stakeholders and the wider public. Since 2018, she has been President of the Architectural Association School of Architecture, London.

Early career 
Victoria Thornton began her career as editor of the RIBA London Annual Review, and as a producer of international study programmes, as well as a freelance producer and advisor to architectural practices. She was also (from 1994) Director of the first formal RIBA Architecture Centre, developing weekly lecture programmes and international exhibitions.

With Kenneth Allinson, she has co-authored since 1994 several editions of the Guide to London's Contemporary Architecture.

Open House and Open-City 
In 1992 Thornton founded the charity Open House (later renamed Open-City) in London to enable people outside the profession to have a better understanding of architecture and urban design. The Open House initiative seeks to showcase outstanding architecture for all to experience, free of charge, and to invite everyone to explore, debate and advocate for the value of a well-designed built environment. The first programme in 1992 featured 20 buildings, that in 1994 over 200 and as an annual event in September it has more recently expanded to over 800 buildings. The concept has now been taken up by over 45 cities globally, which together constitute the Open House Worldwide 'family'.

As well as being Director of Open-City and Open House (1992–2016), Thornton also developed and chaired programmes to engage young people and decision-makers in issues around quality in the built environment, including Adopt a School, Architecture in Schools, London Exemplar for Planning Councillors, Summer Architecture Academy and My City Too!. She also created Art in the Open as London's strategy agency for art in the public realm with funding from Arts Council England.

Appointments 
Among the positions Victoria Thornton has held are:

 Trustee and Board Member of the Architectural Association
 Jury Member of the RIBA Royal Gold Medal (2015–17)
 Board Member of Irish Architecture Foundation (2005–13)
 Department of Culture, Media and Sport's Engaging Places Advisory Panel (2007)
 expert advisory panel, Farrell Review of Architecture and the Built Environment

In October 2018 Victoria Thornton was ratified as President and Chair of the Council of the Architectural Association.

She was given an Honorary Fellowship of the RIBA in 2003 and an Honorary MA from London Metropolitan University in 2006, and was awarded an OBE in the 2012 New Year Honours for services to architecture and education. The annual Thornton Lecture was established in 2017 by Open-City in recognition of her contribution to architecture.

References

Sources 

Year of birth missing (living people)
Living people
British women architects
Members of the Order of the British Empire